Böyük Xınıslı is a village and municipality in the Shamakhi Rayon of Azerbaijan. It has a population of 448.

References

Populated places in Shamakhi District